Dowlatabad (also Romanized as Dowlatābād) is a village in Astaneh Rural District, in the Central District of Roshtkhar County, Razavi Khorasan Province, Iran. At the 2006 census, its population was 1,187, in 322 families.

References 

Populated places in Roshtkhar County